Manoolal Dwivedi was an Indian politician.  He was elected to the Lok Sabha, the lower house of the Parliament of India from Hamirpur as a member of the Indian National Congress.

References

External links
 Official Biographical Sketch in Lok Sabha Website

1908 births
Indian National Congress politicians
India MPs 1952–1957
India MPs 1957–1962
India MPs 1962–1967
Lok Sabha members from Uttar Pradesh
Year of death missing